Jinshazhou is an island between Guangzhou and Foshan in Guangdong, China. It covers the total area of about 27 square kilometres. Touted as the metropolis of Guangzhou and Foshan, Jinshazhou is located in northwest Guangzhou, with Baisha River on its east, and Lishui, Zhoucun, Baishacun of Nanhai District, Foshan on its north, west and south.

The island is administrated by both Baiyun District of Guangzhou and Huangqi and Lishui of Nanhai District, Foshan. Its western part which belongs to Guangzhou occupies about 1/3 of its total area (i.e. about 9 square kilometres). This part has been one of the large-scale development zones in Guangzhou.

References

Baiyun District, Guangzhou
Nanhai District
Islands of Guangzhou
Islands of Guangdong
River islands of China